Daniela Surina (born  20 September 1942) is an Italian singer, actress and television personality.

Life and career 
Born in Trieste, Surina started her professional career in 1965, making her film debut in the comedy film Soldati e caporali. During her career she alternated genre films and more ambitious art films. For her performance in Marco Bellocchio's China is Near she was nominated to Nastro d'Argento for Best Supporting Actress and to Grolla d'oro.

Partial filmography
 Soldati e caporali (1965) - Lidia
 Latin Lovers (1965) - (segment "Il telefono consolatore")
 Me, Me, Me... and the Others (1966)
 È mezzanotte... butta giù il cadavere (1966)
 Kill Me Quick, I'm Cold (1967) - Christina
 China is Near (1967) - Giovanna
 Death in the Red Jaguar (1968) - Ria Payne
 Erzählungen aus der neuen Welt (1968) 
 Black Talisman (1969) - Sybille Burton
 Check to the Queen (1969) - Dina
 Heads or Tails (1969)
 Mon oncle Benjamin (1969) - La marquise de Cambyse
 Lettera aperta a un giornale della sera (1970) - Countess Surina
 The Dead Are Alive (1972) - Irene
 Divorce His, Divorce Hers (1973) - Franca

References

External links 
 

Living people
Italian stage actresses
Italian film actresses
Italian television actresses
20th-century Italian actresses
1942 births
Musicians from Trieste
Actors from Trieste
Mass media people from Trieste